Heart and Greed is a 2017 grand production drama produced by TVB and Tencent Penguin Pictures. It is the third installment of the Heart of Greed series following Moonlight Resonance. It stars Bosco Wong, Louise Lee, Ha Yu, Michelle Yim, Susanna Kwan, Louis Yuen and Joseph Lee from the previous installments, and with new additions Vincent Wong, Eliza Sam, Priscilla Wong, Ram Chiang, Sharon Chan, Michael Tong, Jason Chan.

The series is released on Tencent Video from Monday to Friday at 8:00pm. VIP members will be able to watch five new episodes one week ahead. It is then broadcast on TVB Jade at 9:30pm.

Plot
Ling Lai Ying (Louise Lee) and her husband, Wong Wing Ching (Ha Yu), are a well-respected and family-oriented couple who worked hard for years expanding the family business, Ka Cheong Wong Limited, involving cafes, famous for their Hong Kong-style milk tea. In hopes for greater expansion, Wing Ching's sister-in-law, Leung Shun Wah (Susanna Kwan) and her younger brother, Leung Chan (Louis Yuen) attempt to persuade Wing Ching to go public with the company and pursue an IPO (Initial Public Offering). Wing Ching is opposed to the idea, claiming that the family's educational background is limited and going public would be a high risk for the family business.

Meanwhile, Hui Nga Lun (Joseph Lee), an individual who Wing Ching deems as his "benefactor" after Nga Lun served as key witness in defending Wing Ching's innocence in a murder trial, experiences issues in his family's century-old printing business.  The printing business was at risk of bankruptcy and Wing Ching is determined to help Nga Lun. Despite Wing Ching's previous concerns, he goes public with the family business and the two family businesses undergo a merger - forming the Hui Wong Group.  Initially, members in both families are resistant to the idea.  In particular, Yu Sau Wai (Michelle Yim), Nga Lun's wife self-proclaims the Hui family as part of some elite and wealthy class and the Wong family as more grassroots.  However, Nga Lun recognizes that the options are scarce and Wing Ching views going public for Nga Lun as a worthwhile risk.

The merger triggers major changes to both businesses.  With the changes, arise countless conflicts targeting the actions and decisions of members in both families. During this time, the Wong's only son, Wong Wai Ka (Vincent Wong), reconnects with the Hui's only daughter, Hui Bui Yi (Eliza Sam) whom he had met when they were very young children.  The two develop feelings for one another, however when Sau Wai (Bui Yi's mother) suspects the potential for a relationship she openly rejects the idea and the two eventually part ways.  Lai Ying was heartbroken for her son and later again for her daughter, Wong Yi Oi (Sharon Chan) who develops feelings for Cheng Lap On (Michael Tong), a married man, father, and highly regarded employee of the Hui Wong Group.  Ling Shing Fung (Bosco Wong), Lai Ying's younger brother, is also embroiled in a never-ending obscure relationship with his friend, Fong Hei Man (Priscilla Wong).

The turmoil evolving from the merger spirals into a perpetual and relentless feud involving heartbreak and betrayal - testing the resilience, morale, and integrity of the Wong and Hui family.

Cast

Wong/Ling/Leung family

Hui/Yu family

Cheng family

Yeung family

Other cast

Guest Star appearance

Parody Cast and Main Characters 
 Connie as Wong Wing Ching (黄永正)
 Beduk as Ling Lai Ying (凌丽荧)
 Goku as Leong Shun Wah (梁顺华)
 Amalia as Leong Chan (梁赞)
 Putri as Ling Shing Fung (凌乘风)
 Badik as Fong Hei Man (方希雯)
 Monkie Kid 'MK' as Wong Yi Oi (黄以爱)
 Princess Yulan as Wong Wai Ka (黄围家)

Development
It was announced that original cast members Moses Chan, Raymond Lam, Fala Chen, Linda Chung, and Tavia Yeung will not participate in the drama as most of them have ended their contract with TVB.

Filming began on 21 March 2017, and ended on 10 July 2017.

Release & Reception 
The series was released as a grand production in November 2017. Audiences were less excited when a third sequel was announced without majority of the original cast but there was still anticipation since its predecessors were released a decade prior. However, the series was met with mixed reviews and viewership ratings averaged 24 points. Audiences criticized the overall plot with many saying that it is simply a recycled plot and that times have changed from a decade ago; the similar storylines being used were seen as too primitive. Similar to the first two series, there was a parody segment but due to changing times compared to when the first two series aired, it was met with major backlash from Malaysian Chinese as it was seen as racially insensitive and a mockery of their culture and clothing with many Malaysians threatening to boycott future TVB series.

Music

International broadcast

Viewership ratings

Accolades

See also
Heart of Greed
Moonlight Resonance

References

TVB dramas
Hong Kong television series
2010s Hong Kong television series
Television series by Tencent Penguin Pictures